Zhang Xian or Xian Zhang may refer to:

Zhang Xian (deity), Chinese deity, enemy of the eclipse-creating Tiangou and protector of unborn infants and male children
Zhang Xian (poet) (990–1078), Chinese poet from the Song Dynasty
Xian Zhang (conductor) (born 1973), Chinese-American conductor
Zhang Xian (volleyball) (born 1985), Chinese female volleyball player

See also
 Zhang (disambiguation)
 Xian (disambiguation)